Najwa may refer to:

People

Given name
 Najwa Karam (born 1966), Lebanese singer
 Najwa Ghanem, wife of Osama bin Laden
 Najwa Najjar, Palestinian filmmaker
 Najwa Nimri (born 1972), Spanish actress
 Najwa Latif (born 1995), Malaysian singer
 Najwa Qassem (1967–2020), Lebanese journalist
 Najwa Barakat (born 1966), Lebanese novelist
 Najwa Binshatwan (born 1970), Libyan author
 Najwa Kawar Farah (1923–2015), Palestinian educator

Surname
 Aina Najwa (born 1996), Malaysian cricketer

Music
 Najwa (album), a 2017 studio album by jazz trumpeter Wadada Leo Smith

See also
 Najwan